Dudley Allen White (January 3, 1901 – October 14, 1957) was an American businessman and politician who served two terms as a U.S. Representative from Ohio from 1937 to 1941.

Biography 
Born in New London, Ohio, White attended the public schools and was graduated from the New London High School in 1918.
During the First World War served as an enlisted man in the United States Navy.
He was employed with a rubber company in Akron, Ohio, in 1919 and 1920, and also engaged in the insurance business.
He moved to Uhrichsville, Ohio, and engaged in the dry-goods business in 1920 and 1921.
He returned to New London, Ohio, and became associated with a company manufacturing regalia and uniforms 1921–1925.
He entered the newspaper business at Norwalk, Ohio, in 1925, later becoming editor and general manager.
He served as delegate to the Republican National Conventions in 1928 and 1948.
State commander of the American Legion in Ohio in 1929 and 1930.

Congress 
White was elected as a Republican to the Seventy-fifth and Seventy-sixth Congresses (January 3, 1937 – January 3, 1941).
He did not seek renomination in 1940, but was unsuccessful for the Republican nomination for United States Senator.

Later career 
Called to active duty in the United States Navy in 
1942 as a lieutenant commander.
He was promoted to captain and served as director of recruiting and induction until 1946.
He served as director of the Citizens National Bank and president of a broadcasting company in Norwalk, Ohio.
He served as executive director of President Eisenhower's Commission on Intergovernmental Relations in 1954 and 1955.
He served as president and publisher of the Norwalk Reflector-Herald and the Sandusky Register at time of death.

Death
He died in Delaware, Ohio, October 14, 1957.
He was interred in Woodlawn Cemetery, Norwalk, Ohio.

Sources

1901 births
1957 deaths
20th-century American journalists
20th-century American politicians
American male journalists
American newspaper editors
Journalists from Ohio
People from New London, Ohio
People from Norwalk, Ohio
People from Uhrichsville, Ohio
Republican Party members of the United States House of Representatives from Ohio
United States Navy personnel of World War I
United States Navy personnel of World War II
United States Navy sailors